The Porto Metro, part of the public transport (mass transit) system of Porto, Portugal, is a light rail network that runs underground in central Porto and above ground into the city's suburbs. Metro do Porto S.A. was founded in 1993, and the first line of the system opened in 2002.

The network has 6 lines and reaches seven municipalities within the metropolitan Porto area: Porto, Gondomar, Maia, Matosinhos, Póvoa de Varzim, Vila do Conde and Vila Nova de Gaia. It currently has a total of 82 operational stations across  of double track commercial line. Most of the system is at ground level or elevated, but  of the network is underground. The system is run by ViaPORTO.

History

Line A (blue line) between Senhor de Matosinhos and Trindade in central Porto was the first Porto Metro line to open, in 2002. The line was extended in 2004 to Estádio do Dragão, in time for the Euro 2004 Football championship.

On April 14, 2005, Line B (red line) opened. The Casa da Música concert hall (which has a station on the combined ABCEF line) opened on the same day. Lines A and B are the last legacy of a line which once went from Trindade to Famalicão, originally narrow gauge, opened in 1875, completed in 1881 and switched to metre gauge in 1930. (The stretch from Varzim to Famalicão is now a bicycle trail.)

Line C (green line) opened on July 30, 2005, reaching the centre of Maia. An extension to ISMAI opened in March 2006. Line C uses a stretch formerly part of the Guimarães line which joined the current line at Lousado.

Line D (yellow line) proved the most problematic to excavate and opened in 2005. The line runs from João de Deus and Vila Nova de Gaia in the south before crossing the River Douro and passing through central Porto en route to São João Hospital in the north. The São João Hospital and IPO stations were not brought into service until April 2006 due to safety concerns. In October 2011, it was extended to Santo Ovídio.

Line E (violet line) opened on May 27, 2006, connecting the Airport Francisco Sá Carneiro and Campanhã. Several weeks later, the line was extended until Estádio do Dragão. An end-to-end journey takes 33 minutes, with trains departing every 20 minutes.

Line F (orange line) opened on January 2, 2011, connecting the Porto city centre to the Gondomar region in the east, this line runs between Senhora da Hora and Fânzeres.

Lines A, B, C, E & F follow the same course within the City of Porto (between Estádio do Dragão and Senhora da Hora). The transfer point between Line ABCEF and Line D is at Trindade in central Porto; from Trindade to Senhora da Hora, the right of way recycles the original Porto-Varzim-Famalicão/Maia-Trofa-Guimarães trunk line.

Costs and financial results 

As of 2007, the total cost of Porto Metro mass transit public transport system stands on 3,500 million euros - over 1% of Portugal's GDP. The first phase of the project alone, which was led by the mayors of several Grande Porto (Greater Porto) municipalities including Valentim Loureiro as a chairman of the state-owned company, was 140% more expensive than initially planned which means a slippage of over 1,500 million euros. The Porto Metro state-owned company has reported losses every year, reaching a record loss of 122 million euros in 2006.

Trains 
The Metro uses modern Eurotram low-floor, articulated trams. New Flexity Swift LRVs are used on line B, Bx and occasionally line C since 2008, and can reach 100 km/h (62.5 mph). They also have more seats, and can, in common with most modern light rail systems, recover 30% of the total of consumed energy during braking.

The majority of services run with two LRVs coupled together. The Eurotram consists of four main compartments, two in each carriage linked by short corridors, and also features an articulation between the two carriages. They have a capacity of 80 seated and 134 standing passengers.

Tickets
The system uses the "Andante" ticketing system. Machines in stations issue and can recharge Andante Azul - blue "Occasional" tickets, while Andante Gold is a credit-card style "Gold" tickets (which bear a scanned photograph of the holder) that can be purchased in Lojas Andante (Andante Shops). Tickets can also be topped up at Multibanco ATM terminals.

The Porto Metro operates on a proof-of-payment system. Tickets must be validated before travel by scanning them in front of the yellow machines located in stations. A validated occasional ticket allows for unlimited travel within a specified time period, currently 1 hour for the minimum 2-zone ticket, and longer as the number of valid zones increases. The gold passes allow unlimited travel within a pre-defined area, and are available in "anytime" or cheaper "10/16" (off-peak) versions. There is also a daily ticket, known as Andante 24 that allows the user to make unlimited trips within a given day in the zones chosen. For example, a Z3 (3-zone) ticket is valid for 3 zones in any direction of travel from the first validated zone. So, to cover all of the Metro, except the northernmost part of Line B (zones VCD3 and PV_VC), a Z4 ticket is needed, provided it is validated in zone PRT1.

There are no faregates within the Metro; instead, groups of fare inspectors randomly check tickets with hand-held scanners. The current penalty for travelling without a validated ticket is €120.

The metro uses the same zoning system as the majority of public transport providers in the Porto metropolitan area, which is divided by counties, and further divided into numbered sub-zones (for example, VCD3 is the third area of the Vila do Conde county). The PRT1 zone in central Porto is effectively the area contained within the VCI (Via Cintura Interna) inner ring-road, while zones PRT2 and PRT3 are the areas between the VCI and the Estrada da Circunvalação outer ring-road. 

The Andante system is being rolled out across the entire Porto public transit network. STCP bus routes and some other bus routes currently accept Andante and the intention is for the entire bus, metro and suburban train network to become integrated. The same ticket cannot be used on downtown Porto trams and the cable car (Funicular dos Guindais). The Andante Azul that tourists typically use are not valid, though the Andante Gold loaded with monthly tickets may be accepted.

Network

Line A  

Senhor de Matosinhos – Estádio do Dragão
Travel time: 40 minutes 
Headway: 10 minutes
Line A or the Blue Line is the main and, historically, most important of the five Porto Metro lines. It has 23 stations.

The line was opened between Trindade and Senhor de Matosinhos on 7 December 2002, by then Prime Minister Barroso. Until the end of 2002 travel was free of charge to allow users to familiarize themselves with the new light rail line. On June 5, 2004, on the occasion of the Euro 2004 European Football Championship, the section between Trindade and Estádio do Dragão was opened.

Trains run every 10 minutes between 07:00 and 20:00 between Senhor de Matosinhos and Estádio do Dragão, with some trips extended to Fânzeres on Line F. Between 6:00 and 7:00 and after 20:00 the frequency is 15 minutes. After 21:00 trains only run between Senhor de Matosinhos and Trindade.

Flexity Outlook Eurotrams number 001–072 service the line.

Line B/Bx 

Póvoa de Varzim – Estádio do Dragão
Travel time (B): 61 minutes
Travel time (Bx): 53 minutes
Headway: 30 minutes (each service)

Line B or the Red Line has 35 stations and is the longest line of the system.
The line reuses, for almost its entire length, the route of the old Póvoa Line, which connected Trindade to Póvoa de Varzim. Line B was Porto Metro's second line to open. Initially the line only ran between Estádio do Dragão and Senhora da Hora, thus sharing the route with Line A. On March 13, 2005, an extension was opened between Senhora da Hora and Pedras Rubras. On March 18, 2006, after successive delays, the final section to Póvoa de Varzim was officially inaugurated.

The line has two types of services between Póvoa de Varzim and Estádio do Dragão: regular, which stops at all stations; and the Bx express, which only stops only at Portas Fronhas, Vila do Conde, Varziela, Mindelo and Pedras Rubras, between Póvoa de Varzim and Senhora da Hora. From early summer 2011 the express service was expanded to operate daily.

In July 2016, Porto Metro announced that an additional infill station, Modivas Norte, will be added at The Style Outlet. The work is financed 50% by the mall management and will cost a total of €1.2 million. Although no extensions are planned, consideration was given to use the abandoned Famalicão branch to reach Barreiros, near Avenida 25 de Abril, via Mourões. Beyond Póvoa de Varzim the right-of-way has been converted into a cycle path in order to preserve the branch.

Line C 

ISMAI – Campanhã
Travel time: 41 minutes
Headway: 15 minutes

Line D 

Santo Ovídio – Hospital São João
Travel time: 25 minutes 
Minimum headway: 5 / 10 minutes

Line E 

Aeroporto – Trindade
Travel time: 35 minutes
Headway: 30 minutes

Line F 

Senhora da Hora – Fânzeres
Travel time: 39 minutes
Headway: 15 minutes

Funicular dos Guindais 

The Metro do Porto company also operates the Funicular of Guindais, a cable-car system that was originally built in 1891 and was recently remodelled. It connects the riverside area of Ribeira to higher ground at Batalha, near the São Bento station.

Future expansion
Line D: Connection to Vila D'Este. This expansion started to be built in March of 2021 planned to end in 2023.
Line G: Casa da Música to São Bento. The construction started in 2020 and is planned to take three years.
Second line of Gaia : planned to start in 2023 and to end in 2026, with a new crossing of Douro river

Network map

See also

 Trams in Porto
 Sociedade de Transportes Colectivos do Porto (STCP)
 Lisbon Metro
 List of tram and light rail transit systems

References

External links

 Porto Metro Official Homepage
 Official website for the ticketing system
 Map of the Porto Metro network (.pdf file)
 Metro do Porto news archive
 Photos of Metro do Porto's station architecture
 Flickr's Metro do Porto group
Expansion - 2nd and 3rd phases (Portuguese)
 

 
Light rail in Portugal
Álvaro Siza Vieira buildings
750 V DC railway electrification
Railway lines opened in 2002
2002 establishments in Portugal